The clarinet family is a musical instrument family of various sizes and types of clarinets, including the well-known B clarinet, his "brother" A clarinet, the bass clarinet, and the slightly less familiar E and among others.

Clarinets other than the standard B and A clarinets are sometimes known as harmony clarinets. There are many differently-pitched clarinet types, some of which are very rare.  They may be grouped into sub-families, but grouping and terminology vary; the list below reflects popular usage and compares it with systems advocated by a few influential authors.

List of instruments

 Octave clarinets — Very rare. Pitched around an octave higher than the B clarinet.
 A piccolo clarinet. 
 Rendall uses the term octave clarinet and includes also obsolete instruments in C, B, and G.
 Shackleton lists also rare instruments in C, B, and A.
 Soprano clarinet — The most familiar type of clarinet. 
 E clarinet/E sopranino clarinet — Fairly common in the United States and western Europe; less common in eastern Europe. Referred to as the soprano in Commonwealth countries. Resurgence in popularity due to the production of affordable instruments in China.
 D clarinet — Rare in the United States and western Europe. Required in Molter's very early clarinet concertos.
Rendall lists the E and D clarinets, along with obsolete instruments in G, F, and E, as sopranino clarinets.
Shackleton lists the E and D clarinets, along with obsolete instruments in F, and E, as sopranino clarinets.  
The E and D clarinets are commonly called piccolo clarinets in eastern Europe and Russia.
 C clarinet — This instrument became practically obsolete in the orchestras of Europe and the United States in the early twentieth century.  The inclusion of the C clarinet, however was not unusual in orchestral scores from the era of Haydn and Mozart right through to the early 20th century. Mahler certainly included them up until his fourth symphony. Much of the orchestral repertoire of Beethoven and Schubert requires the C clarinet. This being the case, the nineteenth century clarinetists were faced with the difficult task of maintaining and alternating between instruments in A, B and C. Since this was not always necessary or desirable for a first rate clarinetist, who could transpose easily between instruments and may not have wished to change from a warm to a cold instrument, the tendency has been to reduce, with the result that the usage of the C clarinet has gradually declined from the standard classical orchestra. 
Recently, however, the C clarinet is enjoying a resurgence, as there is now a renewed interest in playing older works on their authentic instruments. This applies to orchestral music and also to popular folk styles such as klezmer music. At the same time there has been an innovation in Britain to use a simplified cheaper version of the C clarinet, so called clarinéo, as the principal wind instrument for young learners, a position until recently, occupied by the recorder.  
The clarinet in C is sometimes called for in clarinet choirs, often as a substitute for the oboe. This clarinet has been made more common and inexpensive due to the manufacturing of clarinets of all sizes in China.
 B clarinet — The most common type of clarinet.
 A clarinet — Standard orchestral instrument used alongside the B soprano. It is required primarily in older, European classical music. Every serious classical clarinetist will own both a B and an A clarinet, and cases holding both instruments are common. The A clarinet is not commonly used in band music.
 G clarinet — An instrument that today appears in various guises: a "Turkish clarinet" with Albert system keywork and a range to low E, a Boehm or Oehler system instrument to low E made predominantly in Germany, Italy or China, and as a Boehm system instrument with range to low C (basset clarinet in G) in part a revival of the clarinet d'amore. Primarily used in contemporary art music and certain kinds of ethnic music. This type of clarinet is rare but is becoming more common due to renewed interest. The “Turkish” G clarinet primarily and traditionally uses Albert System key work. Chinese mass production of clarinets in G has brought a slow resurgence to this rare clarinet, however professional standard instruments are available principally in Germany and Italy.
 Rendall lists the C, B, and A clarinets along with the obsolete instrument in B as sopranos, and the clarinet d'amore in A and G and the clarinet in G as obsolete altos.
 Shackleton lists the C, B, A, and G clarinets along with obsolete instruments in B and A as sopranos, noting that the A and G often occurred as clarinette d'amour in the mid-18th century.
 Rice classifies G clarinets with flared bells as altos, with pear- or bulb-shaped bells as clarinets d'amour.
 Basset clarinet — Essentially a soprano clarinet with a range extension to low C (written).
 A basset clarinet — Most common type.
 Basset clarinets in C, B, and G (see also clarinet d'amore) also exist.
Rendall includes no basset clarinets in his classifications. Shackleton has three in his collection: Numbers 5389 (B and A set) and 5393 (in A). See Catalogue of the Sir Nicholas Shackleton Collection, Edinburgh University Collection.
 Basset horn — Alto-to-tenor range instrument with (usually) a smaller bore than the alto clarinet, and a range extended to low (written) C.
 F basset horn — Most common type.
 Rendall lists basset horns in G (obsolete) and F as tenors.
 Shackleton lists also basset horns in G and D from the 18th century.
 Neither Rendall nor Shackleton lists A, E, or E basset horns though these apparently existed in the eighteenth century.
 Alto clarinet — Pitched a perfect fifth (or, rarely, a perfect fourth) lower than the B soprano clarinet.
 E alto clarinet — Most common type. Range usually down to low E (written). Referred to as the tenor in Commonwealth countries.
 Rendall lists the E alto and F tenor clarinets as tenors (along with the basset horns).
 Shackleton lists the F alto clarinet as obsolete.
 Bass clarinet — An octave below the B clarinet often with an extended low range.
 B bass clarinet — The standard bass. Common variants extend to either low C or low E.
 “A” bass clarinet — Very rare today, more common around 1900, though bass clarinets in A and C as well as B were being advertised at least through 1927. Nineteen surviving examples have been cataloged, seven of which are playable, though others exist in private hands and occasionally appear on the used instrument market.
 C bass clarinet — Obsolete. Few examples have survived in playable condition.
 Rendall and Shackleton list C, B, and A; Rendall lists only C as obsolete, while Shackleton calls A "rare".  Rendall groups these in baritone and bass.
 Great Bass Clarinets — An octave below the alto clarinet, in between the bass and contrabass.
 EE contra-alto clarinet, also called EE contrabass clarinet.
 Rendall lists "contrabasset-horns" in G, F, and E (none marked obsolete), grouping these in baritone and bass.
 Shackleton lists only "E contrabass clarinet", grouping it in contrabass (pedal) clarinets.
 Contrabass clarinet — An octave below the bass clarinet.
 BB contrabass clarinet. Common in the 20th century, getting rarer now.
 Rendall lists also contrabass clarinet in C as obsolete, and groups it and the BB contrabass in baritone and bass.
 Shackleton lists only the BB contrabass, grouping it in contrabass (pedal) clarinets
 Two larger types have been built on an experimental basis:
 EEE octocontra-alto — An octave below the contra-alto clarinet. Only one example is confirmed to have been built.
 BBB octocontrabass — An octave below the contrabass clarinet. Only one example is confirmed to have been built.  
 Neither Rendall nor Shackleton includes these in their classifications.

Most common clarinets

Except for the A clarinet and the uncommon A sopranino instrument, the clarinets in standard repertoire are pitched in B or the related E. The following is a list of the most commonly used clarinets.
 B clarinets - There are more B clarinets in the world than all other types of clarinets combined. It is the "default" or generic clarinet. Almost every student begins on a B instrument.
 A clarinet - Next in popularity is the A clarinet. Every professional clarinetist playing classical music has one.
 B bass clarinet - Somewhat less common is the B bass clarinet (older than the alto clarinet). Since about the middle of the 19th century, it has been treated by orchestral composers as an optional supplementary instrument to the standard B soprano or treble clarinet. In music since 1950 it has been used as more of a standard or core instrument in band or wind ensemble music.
 E alto and soprano clarinets - Less common still are the E alto and soprano clarinets. The alto is seen less in classical music than the B bass. It is used most often in band or wind ensemble music. However, the soprano is seen in both orchestral and band settings.
 C and A sopranino clarinet - Still less common are the C clarinet (not used in recent compositions) and the A sopranino. The EE contra-alto and BB contrabass clarinets are seen very infrequently. All other varieties of clarinets are only used in older music (pre-20th century).

References

Clarinets